Ernst Meyer (10 July, 1887, Prostken – 2 February, 1930, Potsdam) was a German Communist political activist and politician and a general secretary of the KPD. He is best remembered as a founding member and top leader of the Communist Party of Germany and as the leader of that party's fraction in the Prussian Landtag. A political opponent of Ernst Thälmann, Meyer was moved out of the top party leadership after 1928, not long before his death of tuberculosis-related pneumonia at the age of 43.

Biography

Early years

Ernst Meyer was born in 1887 in Prostken, East Prussia, to a religiously devout working-class family.

Meyer studied economics and philosophy at the University of Königsberg, from which he received a PhD in 1910.

Political career
Meyer joined the  Social Democratic Party of Germany (SPD) in 1908, while he was still a student in college, beginning to write almost immediately for Vorwärts (Forward), the SPD's official daily newspaper. In 1911 Meyer was promoted to the position of the economics editor of 'Vorwärts.

At the time of World War I, Meyer took his place on the extreme left of the SPD, along with Rosa Luxemburg, Karl Liebknecht, Franz Mehring, and Clara Zetkin. He was a close political friend of Leo Jogiches and participated in the issuance of the letters and leaflets of the Spartakusbund (Spartacus League). Meyer remained the only Spartakan on the editorial board of Vorwärts and he attempted to resist efforts by the majority of the editorial board to support German efforts in the war. This discordant position made Meyer a target of the SDP's right wing and on April 15, 1915, he was removed from his position on the paper's editorial board.

Meyer was the delegate of the Spartacus League to the Zimmerwald Conference in 1915, one of five Germans from three political groups to participate. Meyer and his Spartacist comrade, Bertha Thälheimer, did not lend their support to the resolution of the Zimmerwald Left at that gathering demanding an immediate break of revolutionary socialists from the reformist wing of the Social Democratic movement.

Meyer also served as a delegate to the Zimmerwald movement's second conference, held at Kienthal the following year.

Following the trial of Karl Liebknecht for his anti-war activities, Meyer went into hiding together with his comrades Luxemburg and Mehring.

At the end of 1918 the Spartacus League became the Communist Party of Germany (KPD). Meyer was elected as one of the twelve members of the Zentrale (Central Committee) of the new organization.

During the German Revolution of 1918–19, Meyer emerged to serve on the editorial board of Die Rote Fahne (The Red Flag), the official organ of the Communist Party. He was a founding member of the Communist Party of Germany in December 1918 and was elected by the founding congress to the governing Central Committee of the new organization.

In 1920 Meyer was re-elected to the Zentrale and was made a member of the party's Political Bureau. The summer of that same year he attended the 2nd World Congress of the Communist International in Moscow as a representative of the KPD. Meyer reported on the agrarian question to the 2nd Congress, which elected him to the Executive Committee of the Communist International (ECCI) and its Presidium.

In 1921, Meyer was elected as a Communist to the Prussian Landtag.

At the August 1921 congress of the KPD, Meyer delivered the keynote speech, the political report of the Zentrale, emphasizing his place as a top leader of the organization.

Meyer returned to Moscow in 1922 as a member of the German delegation to the 4th World Congress of the Comintern. After his return, Mayer became one of the main architects of the "united front" tactics in Germany. The tactics was a reflection on the failed March 1921 uprising, inspired by the "offensive tactics". Instead of minority uprisings, the KPD now sought to build a mass base.

Meyer again delivered the key political report to the KPD's January 1923 party congress, but this time he was not re-elected to the Central Committee. He nevertheless remained an important member of the German Communist Party, returning to the top echelon after a further factional shift in 1925.

In the spring of 1926 Meyer attended the 6th Enlarged Plenum of the Comintern, although he faced personal criticism in that body's discussion of the German question. He returned in November to participate in the 7th Enlarged Plenum of the CI.

Meyer was re-elected to the Central Committee and its Politburo by the 1927 congress of the KPD. He was one of the leaders of the Versöhnler (Conciliator) faction and a political opponent of Ernst Thälmann, whose ascendency to top leadership of the KPD in 1928 effectively spelled the end of Meyer's political career.

Meyer addressed the KPD's 12th Congress in June 1929, but he was removed of all party functions.

Death and legacy
In the winter of 1929–30 Meyer, who had long suffered from tuberculosis, contracted a case of pneumonia. He died on February 2, 1930, at the age of 43 in Potsdam.

At the time of his death Meyer's comrade Paul Frölich remembered Meyer as a "very cool, sober, and deliberate thinker" who was valued for these characteristics during debates over party policies and tactics.

Footnotes

Further reading
 Florian Wilde: "Building a Mass Party: Ernst Meyer and the United Front Policy 1921–1922", in: Ralf Hoffrogge / Norman LaPorte (eds.): Weimar Communism as Mass Movement 1918-1933, London: Lawrence & Wishart, pp. 66–86.
 Pierre Broué, The German Revolution, 1917–1923. [1971] John Archer, trans. Chicago: Haymarket Books, 2006.
 "The Decline, Disorientation and Decomposition of a Leadership: The German Communist Party: From Revolutionary Marxism to Centrism," Revolutionary History,'' Vol. 2 No. 3 (Autumn 1989). Part 1. || Part 2.

External links 
Ernst Meyer Archive at Marxists.org

1887 births
1930 deaths
People from Ełk County
People from East Prussia
Social Democratic Party of Germany politicians
Communist Party of Germany politicians
German revolutionaries
German Comintern people
People of the Weimar Republic